Pa Rudbar (also Romanized as Pā Rūdbār; also known as Parūdār) is a village in Jirandeh Rural District, Amarlu District, Rudbar County, Gilan Province, Iran. At the 2006 census, its population was 427, in 104 families.

References 

Populated places in Rudbar County